The following are the football (soccer) events of the year 1960 throughout the world.

Clubs founded
 NK Maribor

Events
Copa Libertadores 1960
Won by Peñarol after defeating Olimpia Asunción on an aggregate score of 2–1.
European Cup 1959-60
Real Madrid beat Eintracht Frankfurt, 7–3, in the final at Hampden Park
Inter-Cities Fairs Cup 1958-60
FC Barcelona defeated Birmingham City in the final, 4–1, on aggregate
1960 International Soccer League
Bangu beat Kilmarnock F.C., 2–0, in the final at the Polo Grounds
April 3 – Humphrey Mijnals becomes the first player from Surinamese descent who makes his debut for the Netherlands national football team when Holland defeats Bulgaria (4–2) in a friendly.

Winners club national championship
 : Club Atlético Independiente
 : Palmeiras
 : Burnley
 : Stade de Reims
 : Újpest FC
 : Hapoel Petah Tikva F.C.
 : Juventus
 : Chivas Guadalajara
 : Ajax Amsterdam
 : Olimpia Asunción
 : Torpedo Moscow
 : Barcelona
 : IFK Norrköping
 : Beşiktaş

International tournaments
 UEFA European Football Championship in France (July 6 – 10 1960)
 
 
 
Olympic Games in Rome, Italy (August 26 – September 10, 1960)
 
 
 
1960 British Home Championship (October 3, 1959 – April 15, 1960)

Births

 January 3 – Washington César Santos, Brazilian international footballer (died 2014)
 February 10 – Miguel Bossio, Uruguayan international footballer
 February 27 – Jan van Grinsven, Dutch footballer
 March 27 – Hans Pflügler, German international footballer
 April 4 – Marvin Obando, Costa Rican footballer
 April 11 – Marko Elsner, Slovenian international footballer (died 2020)
 April 14 – Gian Piero Ventrone, Italian coach and athletic trainer (died 2022)
 April 16 – Pierre Littbarski, German international footballer and manager
 April 18 – Zvjezdan Cvetković, Yugoslavian international footballer and Croatian Serb manager (died 2017)
 April 29 – Ron de Groot, Dutch footballer and manager
 June 25 – Craig Johnston, Australian footballer
 July 20 – Lauren Gregg, American soccer coach
 August 9 – Viorel Turcu, Romanian international footballer (died 2020) 
 August 24 – Jimmy Montanero, Ecuadorian international footballer 
 August 28 – Julio César Romero, Paraguayan footballer
 October 30 – Diego Maradona, Argentine international footballer (died 2020)
 November 26 – Rémy Vogel, French international footballer (died 2016)
 November 27 – Martin van Geel, Dutch footballer
 November 30 – Gary Lineker, English international footballer and TV presenter
 December 20 – Piet Keur, Dutch footballer
 December 31 – Steve Bruce, English international

Deaths

June
 June 25 - Charlie Buchan (68), English international footballer (born 1891)

September
 September 15 - Héctor Castro, Uruguayan striker, winner of the 1930 FIFA World Cup. (55, Heart attack)

References

 
Association football by year